Nerthus (minor planet designation: 601 Nerthus) is a minor planet orbiting the Sun. See mythology of Nerthus.

References

External links
 
 

Ursula asteroids
Nerthus
Nerthus
X-type asteroids (Tholen)
C-type asteroids (SMASS)
19060621